Moving Target is a 2011 British thriller, from director Mark Tierney. The film was formerly known as Naked in London.

Set on the hottest day of the year in London it follows the character Steve Lynch in an afternoon full of explosive situations.

Plot 
On the hottest day of a sweltering London summer, Steve Lynch must repay a £1,000,000 loan by 5pm, or lose everything he has ever worked for. An outrageous wager offers him a solution: run from North to South West London in less than two hours. But the events and people he encounters along the way will change his life forever.

Background 
Moving Target is set in London on a bank holiday that also happens to be the hottest day of the year (in real life usually in late July, early August). The film was partly inspired by the summer of 2003, which had record breaking sunshine.

Cast
 Michael Greco as Steve Lynch
 Steven Berkoff as Lawrence Masters
 Jake Maskall as Jonathan Porchester
 Meredith Ostrom as Callas
 Francesca Annis as Vanassa Swift
 Mark Rathbone as Roy Wegerley
 Nick Townsend as Peter Denby
 Duncan Bannatyne as Donald McKay
 Colin Salmon as Ralph
 David Cleveland-Dunn as Bobby Adams
 Nik Philpot as The Driver

References

External links 
  
 

British action thriller films
2011 films
2011 action thriller films
2010s English-language films
2010s British films